Redemption is the second solo studio album by American rapper and record producer Benzino. It was released January 14, 2003 via Elektra Records and ZNO Records. Production was primarily handled by Benzino's production team Hangmen 3, as well as Mario Winans, Gary "Gizzo" Smith, L.E.S., L.T. Hutton, Paul "Little Bo Peezy" Hemphill, Sean "Inferno" Dunnigan, That Nigga Moel, Tone Capone and Trackmasters. It features guest appearances from Mario Winans, Mass Murderer Mike, Black Child, Caddillac Tah, Daz Dillinger, Hussein Fatal, Jadakiss, Jewell, Kid Javi, Lil' Kim, LisaRaye, Petey Pablo, Scarface and Wyclef Jean.

The album peaked at number 65 on the Billboard 200 and at number 31 on the Top R&B/Hip-Hop Albums. It featured two singles: "Rock the Party" and "Would You", both produced by Mario Winans. "Rock the Party" made it to number 82 on the Billboard Hot 100, and also appeared on the US version of The Transporter: Music from and Inspired by the Motion Picture, was featured in the 2002 film I-SPY and in the 2003 video game NBA Street Vol. 2.

The song "Pull Your Skirt Up" is a direct diss track aimed at Shady/Aftermath artists D12, G-Unit, Dr. Dre and Obie Trice, initially released as B-side of UK versions of "Rock the Party" single during ongoing Benzino and Eminem feud. While Benzino was recording the album, he made sure to work with people who were beefing with 50 Cent at the time, such as Black Child and Cadillac Tah from Murder Inc Records, Fatal and Lil' Kim.

Track listing

Notes
Track 1 features backing vocals by Famil
Track 14 features backing vocals by LovHer

Sample credits
Track 1 contains a sample of "Blue Sky and Silver Bird" by Lamont Dozier
Track 5 contains samples from "Tear It Down" by Blue Magic
Track 7 contains elements from "Aâlach Tloumouni" by Khaled
Track 10 contains elements from "Maybe It's Love This Time" by The Stylistics
Track 14 contains elements of "She's Lonely" written by Bill Withers

Charts

References

External links

2002 albums
Benzino albums
Elektra Records albums
Albums produced by L.T. Hutton
Albums produced by Trackmasters
Albums produced by L.E.S. (record producer)